Wonderswan were an alternative indie rock band, based in Leeds, England.

Career
Preceded by a self-released CDR, Wonderswan's first commercial release was on 4 May 2009 with the track "Hey Nature", which was included on the Dance To The Radio release 4x12" Volume 1, followed on 10 May by their first 7" vinyl release entitled "Furrrpile". In 2009 Wonderswan played the BBC Introducing stage at Reading and Leeds festivals. In 2010 Wonderswan released a cassette tape through Sea Owl Records which received favourable reviews from Collective Zine and Drowned In Sound, who featured a download of the track Maple Syrup. A video was made for the track Super Star Destroyer which was made entirely from clips taken from Dünyayı Kurtaran Adam, a bizarre Turkish remake of Star Wars.

Musical influences
The band is influenced by the work of rock and grunge bands from the late 1980s and early to mid 1990s, their sound has been frequently compared to Pavement although the band themselves cite influences including Sonic Youth, Guided By Voices and Dinosaur Jr. making use of Lo-Fi recordings, distorted band compositions and elements of guitar solos along with influences from Shoegaze bands such as My Bloody Valentine with several instrumental "sound experiments" featured on the EP I Wish I Was Deep Instead Of Just Macho. Their somewhat messy style has been described as "sloppy yet brilliant" and "beautiful chaos".

Discography

Singles
"Untitled (Bear)" – CDR, 2008
"Furrrpile" – 7" Single, 2009 (Good Form Club)
"I Wish I Was Deep Instead of Just Macho" – Cassette E.P, 2010 (Sea Owl)

Compilations
 4 x 12" Volume 1 – Hey Nature, 2009 Dance To The Radio
 Kicking Against The Pricks Compilation No. 1 – Friends For Life (Pt. 1), 2010 KATP Tapes
 Heavy Medicine – A Stitch In Space-Time, 2010 Tally Ho! (Fanzine)
 Hilarious Consequences by Babak Ganjei – Soundtrack To The Graphic Novel – Friends For Life (Pt. 1), 2010 Records Records Records

Other activities
Members of Wonderswan also play in several other bands. Ged fronts the indie-pop band Downdime, SS plays in psychedelic outfit Hookworms and Michael plays in dreampop duo Martian Scorsese. Michael made the artwork for Wonderswan's first release, the untitled Bear CDR and also the video for the track Super Star Destroyer. He recorded and produced the debut EP from indie-pop band This Many Boyfriends which was released via Thee Sheffield Phonographic Corporation. Michael also writes a regular TV column Mike TV for the online fanzine Kicking Against The Pricks.

References

External links
Wonderswan at Last FM
Leeds Music Scene

Indie rock groups from Leeds